Timahoe GAA is a Gaelic Athletic Association gaelic football club in the village of Timahoe, County Laois, Ireland.

Club colours are red and white and the club grounds are called Páirc Mochua. It provided the venue for the 1984 All-Ireland Senior Ladies' Football Championship Final, where Kerry defeated Leitrim.

Timahoe's only Laois Senior Football Championship title to date came in 1969 when Tom Joe Bradley captained the club to the county title.

Bobby Miller was probably one of Timahoe's greatest ever players while former Laois senior star Pauric Clancy was midfielder on the 2003 Laois team which won the Leinster Senior Football Championship.

Current and former Laois senior players Damien O'Connor, Brendan Quigley and Eoin Culliton all play for the club.

In 2008, Timahoe reached the final of the Laois Senior Football Championship only to lose to Portlaoise (their sixth senior final defeat) and in a major reversal of fortunes in 2009, Timahoe were relegated to the intermediate grade. Having returning to senior ranks in 2010, the club were again relegated at the end of the 2013 season .

Timahoe have previously won the Laois Intermediate Football Championship on four occasions, 1962, 2000, 2004 and 2010.

Hurling in the club takes place under the banner of the Park/Ratheniska-Timahoe club which was formed in late 2017 from the amalgamation of the hurling wings of the Timahoe and Park/Ratheniska clubs.

Achievements
 Laois Senior Football Championship: (1) 1969
 Laois Intermediate Football Championship (4) 1962, 2000, 2004, 2010

Notable players
 Pauric Clancy
 Bobby Miller
Brendan Quigley
 Sue Ramsbottom (ladies' football)
Liam (Sheriff) Ramsbottom
Conor Fitzpatrick 
Pat Smyth
Ruairí O'Connor
Richard Oxley 
Damien O'Connor, Laois vice-captain to Stephen Attride in 2019
Eoin Culliton

References

External links
 History of Timahoe GAA

Gaelic games clubs in County Laois
Gaelic football clubs in County Laois
Hurling clubs in County Laois